Thane Municipal Corporation is the governing body of the city of Thane in the Indian state of Maharashtra. The municipal corporation consisting of democratically elected members, is headed by a mayor and administers the city's infrastructure, public services and transport. Members from the nation's and state's leading political parties such as the Nationalist Congress Party, Indian National Congress, Shiv Sena, Bhartiya Janata Party and the Maharashtra Navnirman Sena hold elected offices in the corporation.

The TMC has jurisdiction over the towns of Kalwa, and Mumbra-Kausa, along with the main city of Thane. Thane Municipal Corporation has been formed with functions to improve the infrastructure of town.

Taxes in Thane 
The municipal corporation has recently added a new tax as a substitute for Octroi i.e. Local Body Tax from 1 April 2013  This indirect tax has been repealed.

Revenue sources 

The following are the Income sources for the Corporation from the Central and State Government.

Revenue from taxes  
Following is the Tax related revenue for the corporation.

 Property tax.
 Profession tax.
 Entertainment tax.
 Grants from Central and State Government like Goods and Services Tax.
 Advertisement tax.

Revenue from non-tax sources 

Following is the Non Tax related revenue for the corporation.

 Water usage charges.
 Fees from Documentation services.
 Rent received from municipal property.
 Funds from municipal bonds.
 Fines & Penalty & late fees etc.

List of Mayor

Election results

2017 results 
The results of Election 2017 are shown in the following table. Voter turnout was 58.08%.

2012 results 
The results of election 2012 are shown in the following table.

References 

Thane
Municipal corporations in Maharashtra
Year of establishment missing